Carlo Westphal (born November 25, 1985 in Wolmirstedt) is a German professional road bicycle racer, currently unattached following the collapse of Team Gerolsteiner.

Palmares 

 Thüringen Rundfahrt - 1 stage (2004)
 3rd, National U23 Road Race Championship (2004)
 Niedersachsen-Rundfahrt - U19 version (2003)
 Eneco Tour - 5th stage (2008)

External links 
 

1985 births
Living people
People from Wolmirstedt
German male cyclists
Cyclists from Saxony-Anhalt
People from Bezirk Magdeburg